13 Letters is a Nigerian romantic movie written by Pearl Agwu and directed by Kayode Peters.  It  stars the Gulder Ultimate Search winner, Kunle Remi, BBNaija's Teddy A, Mofe Duncan, Bimbo Ademoye, Bolanle Ninolowo, Amanda Dara, Adedamola Adewole Ariyike Dimples, Chris Iheuwa

Premiere 
On the 1st of October 2021, 13 Letters made its debut at GidiBoxOffice production, which gives chance for people to stream anywhere in the world.

Synopsis 
The story revolves around a playboy who suffers major damage when his ex-girlfriends teamed up to express their grievances on social media.

Language 
Since the movie wanted to portray the culture, the director opted for Yoruba language to be seventy percent though there is a subtitle for non-Yoruba speakers

Cast 
Kunle Remi, BBNaija's Teddy A, Mofe Duncan, Bimbo Ademoye, Bolanle Ninolowo, Amanda Dara, Adedamola Adewole Ariyike Dimples, Chris Iheuwa

References 

2021 films
Nigerian romance films
Nigerian romantic drama films
Yoruba-language films